Axiocerses punicea, the rainforest scarlet or Punic scarlet, is a butterfly in the family Lycaenidae. It is found in Kenya, Tanzania, Malawi, Zimbabwe, Mozambique and possibly the Democratic Republic of the Congo. The habitat consists of forests.

Adults are attracted to flowering shrubs. They are on wing year round.

The larvae feed on Ximenia caffra.

Subspecies
Axiocerses punicea punicea (Kenya, Tanzania, Malawi)
Axiocerses punicea cruenta (Trimen, 1894) (Zimbabwe, Mozambique)

References

Butterflies described in 1889
Axiocerses
Butterflies of Africa
Taxa named by Henley Grose-Smith